Chennai is nicknamed the "Detroit of Asia" due to the presence of major automobile manufacturing units and allied industries around the city. 

The 4-wheeler vehicles in Chennai is the base of 30% of India's automobile industry and 35% of its automobile component industry. Besides the commercial industry, the Heavy Vehicles Factory (HVF) has been established in Avadi to produce military related vehicles. Avadi also boasts of the Combat Vehicles Research and Development Establishment (CVRDE), a new engine testing facilities.

Automotive manufacturers

Tyre manufacturers

Auto-components manufacturers
Auto component companies have their manufacturing plants in and around Chennai include 
 Avalon Technologies
 Ashley Alteams
 Bavina Industries
 Bharat Forge
 BorgWarner
 Brakes India
 Brembo
 Caterpillar
 Delphi-TVS Diesel Systems, Ennore Foundries 
 Faurecia
 Federal-Mogul
 Design Edge Technologies
 Hidromas
 India Pistons
 Iochpe Maxion
 JKM Daerim
 Hella
 Hyundai Wia
 Hyundai Mobis
 Korea Fuel Tech
 Lear Corporation
 Leo Primecomp
 Machino
 Mando Corporation
 Motherson Sumi
 Rane
 SEW Eurodrive 
 Simpson & Co.
 Sundaram Clayton
 Wabco
 Takata
 TI Cycles
 Tube Products of India
 TVS Motors
 Valeo
 Visteon
 Wheels India
 YAPP Automotive

References

Economy of Chennai
Automotive industry in India